Yasmin Louise Sooka is a leading human rights lawyer, the Executive Director of the Foundation for Human Rights in South Africa and a trustee of the Desmond Tutu Peace Centre. She was born in Cape Town, South Africa, and got a law degree from the University of the Witwatersrand. She is an expert on transitional justice, gender and international war crimes.

She was member of the South African Truth and Reconciliation Commission and of the Sierra Leone Truth and Reconciliation Commission, a member of the United Nations Report of the Secretary-General's Panel of Experts on Accountability in Sri Lanka to investigate war crimes in the final stages of the Sri Lankan Civil War, and currently serves as the Chair of the United Nations Commission on Human Rights in South Sudan.

References 

Living people
South African women lawyers
South African human rights activists
People from Cape Town
University of the Witwatersrand alumni
Year of birth missing (living people)
20th-century South African lawyers
21st-century South African lawyers